Elena Litchman is a professor of aquatic ecology at Michigan State University known for her research on the consequences of global environmental change on phytoplankton.

Education and career 

Litchman received an Honors Diploma in biology from Moscow State University, Russia, and a Ph.D. in ecology from the University of Minnesota in 1997. Following graduate work, Litchman held postdoctoral positions at the Smithsonian Environmental Research Center, the Swiss Federal Institute for Aquatic Science and Technology, and Rutgers University. From 2003 to 2005, Litchman was a research scientist at Georgia Institute of Technology. In 2005, Litchman took a position in the Zoology Department of Michigan State University and the W.K. Kellogg Biological Station. She has been named a MSU Foundation Professor at Michigan State University where she works in the Department of Integrative Biology.

Research 
Litchman's Ph.D. research examined the impact of changing light levels on competition in phytoplankton. She introduced the use of trait-based ecology for phytoplankton in papers published in 2007 and 2008. Prior to these publications, trait-based ecology had been implemented in terrestrial science and Litchman was the first to apply these ideas to marine research. Key traits in phytoplankton include light, nutrient use, morphology, predation, and temperature, and Litchman has combined these traits to mathematically define phytoplankton community structure. Litchman's research has examined the connection between the size of phytoplankton over evolutionary time and nutrient limitation which, in turn, impacts marine food webs under changing climates. Through eco-evolutionary modeling, Litchman's research has shown that in the future warmer oceans will cause phytoplankton to shift towards polar regions.

Selected publications

Awards 

 Presidential Early Career Award for Scientists and Engineers (PECASE) Award (2010) "For integration of theoretical and experimental studies to predict how global environmental change modifies physical processes and phytoplankton diversity and evolution within lakes, and for interdisciplinary training and outreach to K-12 teachers."
 Petersen Foundation Excellence Professorship Award, Germany (2017)
G. Evelyn Hutchinson Award from the Association for the Sciences of Limnology and Oceanography (2021)

References

External links 

University of Minnesota alumni
Moscow State University alumni
Michigan State University faculty
Ecologists
Women ecologists
Evolutionary biologists
Living people
Year of birth missing (living people)